Ralph Okey Nwosu is the founder and the national chairman of the African Democratic Congress (ADC) and was the co-chairman of the Inter-party Advisory Committee (IPAC), the umbrella body of registered political parties in Nigeria, election committee in 2016.

Background and education

Ralphs Okey Nwosu was born in Awka, Anambra State. Holds the traditional title of Ikolo Dike Orabueze Awka bestowed on him in 1994, and is a member of the cabinet. Nwosu is a practicing Catholic.

He graduated from St. Edward's University, Austin Texas, USA, in 1982, he majored in Chemistry with a minor in Liberal Arts. He has a Master of Science in Organizational Leadership (MSOL) from Norwich University, Northfield, Vermont, USA, PhD program in leadership Change and likewise, Seminal Studies at Antioch University, Ohio, USA.

Career and political activities

Nwosu is the founder and the National Chairman of the African Democratic Congress ADC, a third force political party in Nigeria and former President Inter-Party Advisory Council of Nigeria (IPAC).

Nwosu form a formidable coalition with the  Coalition of United Political Parties (CUPP) to stop the re-election of President Muhammadu Buhari and the All Progressive Congress (APC) from power in  2019.

He also led the African Democratic Congress (ADC)  to absorb The Coalition of Nigeria Movement (CNM) formed by former Nigerian President, Olusegun Obasanjo.

In 2022, After the 48 hours of electricity blackout nationwide due to grid collapse, he condemned President Muhammadu Buhari’s ineptitude and lack of political will to ensure a constant power supply in the country.

References 

Living people
People from Awka
African Democratic Congress politicians
Norwich University alumni
Nigerian Roman Catholics
Year of birth missing (living people)